STS-2 was the second Space Shuttle mission conducted by NASA, and the second flight of the orbiter Columbia. The mission, crewed by Joe H. Engle and Richard H. Truly, launched on November 12, 1981, and landed two days later on November 14, 1981. STS-2 marked the first time that a crewed, reusable orbital vehicle returned to space. This mission tested the Shuttle Imaging Radar (SIR) as part of the OSTA-1 (Office of Space and Terrestrial Applications) payload, along with a wide range of other experiments including the Shuttle robotic arm, commonly known as Canadarm. Other experiments or tests included Shuttle Multispectral Infrared Radiometer, Feature Identification and Location Experiment, Measurement of Air Pollution from Satellites, Ocean Color Experiment, Night/Day optical Survey of Lightning, Heflex Bioengineering Test, and Aerodynamic Coefficient Identification Package (ACIP). One of the feats accomplished was various tests on the Orbital Maneuvring System (OMS) including starting and restarting the engines while in orbit and various adjustments to its orbit. The OMS tests also helped adjust the Shuttle's orbit for use of the radar. During the mission, President Reagan called the crew of STS-2 from Mission Control Center in Houston.

In the early planning stages of the Space Shuttle program, STS-2 was intended to be a reboost mission for the aging Skylab space station. However, such a mission was impeded by delays with the Shuttle's development and the deteriorating orbit of Skylab. Skylab ultimately de-orbited on July 11, 1979, two years before the launch of STS-2.

Crew 

Engle had been the original selection as Lunar Module Pilot for Apollo 17, but was bumped in favor of Harrison Schmitt when it became clear that the mission would be the last lunar landing. As a consequence, both Engle and Truly were rookies during STS-2 (Engle had flown the X-15 above  and so had earned USAF astronaut wings, but was still considered a NASA rookie), constituting the first all-rookie crew since Skylab 4. Engle was the last NASA rookie to command his first flight until Raja Chari in 2021 with SpaceX Crew-3. Engle and Truly had also served as one of the two Shuttle crews during the Approach and Landing Tests (ALT) program in 1977.

Backup crew 

This crew would later fly on STS-4.

Support crew 
 Daniel C. Brandenstein (ascent CAPCOM)
 James F. Buchli
 Terry J. Hart
 Frederick H. Hauck (entry CAPCOM)
 Sally K. Ride (first American woman CAPCOM)

Mission summary 

The second Space Shuttle mission launched from Kennedy Space Center on November 12, 1981, with liftoff occurring at 15:10:00 UTC, 7 months after STS-1. The planned launch time of 12:30UTC was delayed while a faulty data transmitting unit on Columbia was replaced with one from new , which had been shipped overnight from the Palmdale, California factory where Challenger was still being manufactured.

Originally, the launch had been set for October 9, 1981, but it was delayed by a nitrogen tetroxide spill during the loading of the forward Reaction Control System (RCS) tanks. The spill necessitated the removal, decontamination and reapplication of over 300 thermal tiles. The tiles could be reached from platforms at Launch Complex 39A, allowing the work to take place without destacking Columbia and returning it to the Orbiter Processing Facility (OPF). It was next scheduled for November 4, 1981, but was again scrubbed when high oil pressures were discovered in two of the three Auxiliary Power Units (APUs) that controlled the orbiter's hydraulic system. That issue was attributed to hydrazine seepage contaminating the lubrication system in the APUs.

The flight marked the first time an orbital crewed space vehicle had been re-flown with a second crew. Prior to launch, Columbia spent 103days in the Orbiter Processing Facility. It again carried the DFI package, as well as the OSTA-l payload (named for the NASA Office of Space and Terrestrial Applications), which consisted of a number of remote-sensing instruments mounted on a Spacelab pallet in the payload bay. These instruments, including the Shuttle Imaging Radar-A (SIR-A), successfully carried out remote sensing of Earth's resources, environmental quality, and ocean and weather conditions. In addition, the Canadian-built "Canadarm" Remote Manipulator System (RMS) was successfully operated in all its various operating modes for the first time.

During the mission, the Mission Control Center was visited by President Ronald Reagan. He was supposed to visit during STS-1, but was forced to cancel due to an assassination attempt on March 30, 1981.

Although the STS-2 mission had been planned for a duration of five days, with a few hours a day spent testing the Canadarm, the flight was cut short when one of the three fuel cells that produced electricity and drinking water failed. The mission was shortened to two days, and the Canadarm tests were canceled. The crew stayed awake during a scheduled sleep period and tested the arm anyway, working during the loss of signal (LOS) periods when they were not in contact with Mission Control. The deorbit and reentry phase of this mission differed from STS-1, in that while the first shuttle entry was flown as a "middle of the road" test of the automatic guidance, the success of that mission allowed for the STS-2 crew to explore the stability margins of the vehicle's performance. Twenty-nine planned Programmed Test Inputs (PTIs) were manually flown in the Control Stick Steering (CSS) mode, with Engle making use of his past experience in the X-15. These PTIs provided useful data for subsequent engineering modifications. Contrary to the interviewer's assertion in a JSC Oral history conversation with Engle, he hand flew manoeuvres throughout the entire entry speed range, but not for the entire duration. As a consequence of STS-1 entry anomalies, the first roll manoeuvre was flown manually and the elevon scheduling was adjusted to offload the body flap.

Chase 1 crewed by astronauts "Hoot" Gibson and Kathy Sullivan escorted Columbia on final approach.

Despite the truncated flight, more than 90% of the mission's objectives were achieved. Moreover, modifications of the water sound suppression system at the pad, to absorb the solid rocket booster overpressure wave during launch, were effective; no tiles were lost and only 12 were damaged. Columbia was flown back to the Kennedy Space Center on November 25, 1981.

STS-2 was the first Space Shuttle flight where O-ring blow-by was observed. After the damage was discovered, another O-ring was intentionally damaged to a further degree. It was then put through a flight simulation at three times the flight pressure. It survived the test, and was endorsed as flightworthy. This same problem would occur on fourteen more Shuttle flights, before contributing to the loss of orbiter Challenger in 1986.

STS-2 was the last shuttle flight to have its external fuel tank (ET) painted white. This lack of paint gave the ET a distinctive orange-brown color, which eventually became emblematic of the Space Shuttle.

Decades later, in 2006, some in the spaceflight community questioned whether the white paint would have prevented the ice-soaked foam shedding issue that led to the loss of Columbia. NASA consensus was that it would not.

Experiments or tests 
STS-2 payloads or experiments:
 OSTA-1 
 Shuttle Imaging Radar
 SRMS, the Shuttle robotic arm, also known as Canadarm
 Shuttle Multispectral Infrared Radiometer
 Feature Identification and Location Experiment
 Measurement of Air Pollution from Satellites
 Ocean Color Experiment
 Night/Day optical Survey of Lightning
 Heflex Bioengineering Test
 Aerodynamic Coefficient Identification Package (ACIP)

They also tested the OMS engines.

Mission insignia 
The mission patch notes the names of the mission's two crew members, and includes an image of a bald eagle, the national bird of the United States, decorated with the colors of the U.S. flag.

Wake-up calls 
NASA began a tradition of playing music to astronauts during the Project Gemini, and first used music to wake up a flight crew during Apollo 15.

Gallery

See also 

 List of human spaceflights
 List of Space Shuttle missions
 Shuttle Radar Topography Mission

Notes

References

External links 

 STS-2 mission summary. NASA.
 STS-2 video highlights . NSS.
 "Space Shuttle Canadarm Robotic Arm Marks 25 Years in Space". NASA. 2006.

Space Shuttle missions
Edwards Air Force Base
Spacecraft launched in 1981
November 1981 events
1981 in California
Spacecraft which reentered in 1981
1981 in Florida